Madeleine (Kétéskwew) Dion Stout  is a Cree author, speaker, and health care professional. She was appointed to the Order of Canada in 2015.

Personal life and education 
Madeleine Dion Stout was born on Kehewin First Nation, Alberta. She graduated as a registered nurse from the Edmonton General Hospital in 1968. Dion Stout later went on to continue her education at the University of Lethbridge, Alberta to earn a bachelor's degree in nursing in 1982.  Dion Stout was one of the first Indigenous women to graduate from a university level nursing program.  In 1993 Dion Stout received a master's degree in international affairs from Carleton University in Ottawa, Ontario.

Dion Stout is currently a resident of Tsawassen First Nation.

Career 
After becoming a registered nurse Dion Stout worked at Health and Welfare Canada the Edmonton General Hospital, and as a public health nurse on Peigan First Nation.  After receiving her nursing degree Dion Stout gained employment with the Alberta Indian Health Care Commission.  In 1983 she began working as a special advisor to the federal minister of Health and Welfare.  In 1985 she was appointed as the director of the Indian and Inuit Health Careers Program. Dion Stout is a former Canadian Studies professor at Carleton University and served as the founding director of Carleton's Centre for Aboriginal Education, Research and Culture (1989 - 1993).

Madeline has held numerous appointments on professional committees and associations including: National Collaborating Centre for Aboriginal Health board member; Well Living House at St. Michael's Hospital Counsel of Grandparents; president of the Aboriginal Nurses Association of Canada; member of the National Forum on Health; British Columbia First Nations Health Authority Board member; Vice-Chair of the Mental Health Commission of Canada board of directors.

Dion Stout is currently self-employed as the president of Dion Stout Reflections Inc. and currently speaks throughout North America and Europe on topics relating to Indigenous health, reconciliation, and healing.

Bibliography 
 Aboriginal Canada: Women and Health. Ottawa: Women's Health Bureau, Health Canada. 1996. 
 Aboriginal Women in Canada: strategic research directions for policy development. Ottawa: Status of Women Canada.1998. By Madeleine Dion Stout, Gregory D. Kipling.  
 Aboriginal Women's Health Research Synthesis Project: Final Report.  Ottawa: The Centres. 2001.  By Madeleine Dion Stout, Gregory D. Kipling, Roberta Stout.  
 The Health Transition Fund. Ottawa: The Fund.  2002. By Madeleine Dion Stout, Gregory D. Kipling. 
 Aboriginal People, Resilience and the Residential School Legacy.  Ottawa: Aboriginal Healing Foundation.  2003.  By Madeleine Dion Stout and Gregory Kipling 
 Lump Sum Compensation Payments Research Project: The Circle Rechecks Itself. Aboriginal Healing Foundation. 2007.  
 "A Survivor Reflects on Resilience" in From Truth to Reconciliation: Transforming the Legacy of Residential Schools. Aboriginal Healing Foundation. 2008. 
 Restoring the Balance: First Nations Women, Community, and Culture.  Winnipeg: University of Manitoba Press. 2009. By Eric Guimond, Madeleine Dion Stout, Gail Guthrie Valaskakis. .
 Knowledge Exchange Workshop: Successful Approaches for the Prevention of Aboriginal Family Violence - Final Report.  Quebec. 2009.
 "Towards Nahi: Addressing Health Equity in Research Involving Indigenous People" in Canadian Journal of Nursing Research 2012.  By Annette J. Browne and Madeleine Dion Stout.

Awards 
Stout has received numerous awards for her work in the health care field and with Indigenous communities including:
 Assiniwkimaik Award, Aboriginal Nurses Association of Canada
 Distinguished Alumnus Award, University of Lethbridge (1995)
 Honorary Doctor of Laws, University of British Columbia
 Honorary Doctor of Laws, University of Ottawa
 Centennial Award, Canadian Nurses Association of Canada (2008)
 Health Category, National Aboriginal Achievement Award (2010)
 Honorary Doctor of Laws, Carleton University (2015)
 Order of Canada Appointment (2015)

References 

Year of birth missing (living people)
Living people
Members of the Order of Canada
Cree people
20th-century First Nations writers
Indspire Awards
21st-century First Nations writers